Defending champion Michael Chang defeated Bohdan Ulihrach in the final, 4–6, 6–3, 6–4, 6–3 to win the men's singles tennis title at the 1997 Indian Wells Masters.

Seeds
The top eight seeds received a bye to the second round.

Draw

Finals

Top half

Section 1

Section 2

Bottom half

Section 3

Section 4

Qualifying

Qualifying seeds

Qualifiers

Lucky loser
  Mikael Tillström

Qualifying draw

First qualifier

Second qualifier

Third qualifier

Fourth qualifier

Fifth qualifier

Sixth qualifier

Seventh qualifier

References

External links
 1997 Newsweek Champions Cup Draw
 ITF tournament profile

Newsweek Champions Cup
1997 Newsweek Champions Cup and the State Farm Evert Cup